Finn Sjue (born 1943) is a Norwegian psychologist, politician, journalist and teacher. He was born in Vestfold. He edited the newspaper Klassekampen from 1973 to 1977. He chaired the Red Electoral Alliance from 1980 to 1982. He has later lectured in journalism at the Oslo University College.

References

1943 births
Living people
People from Vestfold
Norwegian politicians
Norwegian newspaper editors
Academic staff of Oslo University College
Klassekampen editors